This is a list of retro style video game consoles in chronological order. Only officially licensed consoles are listed.

Starting in the 2000s, the trend of retrogaming spawned the launch of several new consoles that usually imitate the styling of pre-2000s home consoles and only play games that released on those consoles. Most retro style consoles are dedicated consoles, but many have an SD Card slot that allows the user to add additional games, an internet connection that allows users to download games, or even support the cartridges of older video game systems such as the Nintendo Entertainment System. Most of these consoles don't sport the original hardware and are thus equipped with a modern microprocessor, prominently an ARM CPU and supporting chips running an emulator to allow the rendering of the particular system.

List

Retro style home consoles (2001–present)

Dedicated retro style home consoles (2001–present)

Non-dedicated retro style home consoles (2008–present)

Retro style handhelds (2001–present)

See also 

 List of video game console emulators
 List of video game consoles
 List of dedicated video game consoles
 List of home video game consoles
 List of handheld game consoles
 List of microconsoles

References 

Lists of video game consoles
Video game consoles, List of
Prequels
Video game prequels
Video game consoles, retro style